The Nocturne in G minor may refer to:

Nocturne in G minor, Op. 15, No. 3 by Frédéric Chopin (the best known)
Nocturne in G minor, Op. 37, No. 1 by Frédéric Chopin